Makoto Moriyama (森山 周, born August 11, 1981) is a Japanese former professional baseball outfielder in Japan's Nippon Professional Baseball. He played for the Orix Buffaloes from 2006 to 2012 and the Tohoku Rakuten Golden Eagles from 2013 to 2015.

External links

NPB.com

1981 births
Japanese baseball coaches
Japanese expatriate baseball players in the United States
Living people
Nippon Professional Baseball coaches
Nippon Professional Baseball outfielders
Orix Buffaloes players
Baseball people from Hyōgo Prefecture
Tohoku Rakuten Golden Eagles players
West Oahu Canefires players